PRPD may refer to:
 2-methylcitrate dehydratase, an enzyme
 Puerto Rico Police